Pseudochorthippus parallelus (often known by its synonym Chorthippus parallelus), the meadow grasshopper, is a common species of grasshopper in the tribe Gomphocerini.  It is found in non-arid grasslands throughout the well vegetated areas of Europe and some adjoining areas of Asia. It is a well-studied organism in the discipline of Evolutionary biology and was an early and important model system for the study of European phylogeography.

Distribution 
The range of the Meadow Grasshopper extends from the Atlantic coast of Europe, including the British Isles, to the Urals. It is found from Scandinavia in the north to southern Spain and Anatolia in the south. It prefers moist vegetation and in southern regions is typically found in river valleys and at altitude (up to approx 2000m), not being found in arid areas.

Physical appearance 
Both sexes are flightless. In females the wing cases (covering vestigial wings) extend only a short way down the abdomen while males have longer wing cases extending to almost the tip of the abdomen. They can be variable in colour with green, brownish, purple-red and pink forms recorded, although green forms are most common. Colour forms are genetically determined and some populations can show high frequency of pink grasshoppers.
Pseudochorthippus parallelus is distinguished from similar species by the approximately parallel nature of the bars (pronotal side-keels) on the back of the neck which gives the species its name.

Possible utilization for human food 
Due to high densities of these insects in Western Europe, some researchers have also proposed their possible utilization as human food. These insects contain 69% proteins on dry weight with excellent amino acid profile and digestibility. Aman Paul and his co-workers indicated that before introducing these insects for human food, it is necessary to do a thorough examination of any possible toxic and/or allergic conditions that could arise from their consumption.

Subspecies 
Various races of the meadow grasshopper have been described in different regions with forms described as separate subspecies.  They include:
 P. parallelus erythropus (Faber, 1958) - Iberian Peninsula
 P. parallelus parallelus (Zetterstedt, 1821) - nominate subsp., widespread including the British Isles
 P. parallelus serbicus Karaman, Z., 1958 
 P. parallelus tenuis (Brullé, 1832) - Greece

These subspecies are the result of the allopatric separation of P. parallelus populations into separate southern European refugia during the Pleistocene ice ages.

The most widespread subspecies, P.p. parallelus, is found throughout much of Europe but is replaced by P.p. erythropus in Iberia. The Iberian erythropus subspecies is characterized in the field by red hind tibiae and differences in the mating song although other studies demonstrate additional differences in morphological, behavioural, chromosomal and DNA sequence characters. There is a hybrid zone between P.p. erythropus and P.p. parallelus running along the ridge of the Pyrenees mountains between Spain and France. A similar hybrid zone has been described between forms in France and Italy that runs along the Alps.

Speciation 
The subspecies do not appear to be speciating by way of reinforcement. This result is among the most important evidences against speciation by reinforcement.

Gallery

References

parallelus
Insects of Asia
Orthoptera of Europe
Insects described in 1821